"Everybody Hates Me" is a song by American music production duo the Chainsmokers. It was produced by the Chainsmokers and Shaun Frank, with lyrics written by Emily Warren and the song's composer Andrew Taggart. It was released by Disruptor Records and Columbia Records on March 16, 2018, as the third single from the duo's second studio album, Sick Boy. Its official music video received a nomination for Best Dance at the 2018 MTV Video Music Awards.

Background
The duo debuted the song during a live show in Prague on February 11, 2018. They first teased the song on March 13, 2018, along with a shot from the song's music video, which shows the duo standing in front of a car that is on fire. The song was officially announced the next day, accompanied by the cover art.

Composition
According to CBS Radio's Jon Wiederhorn, "'Everybody Hates Me' is a mid-tempo, hip-hop-inflected track about being dismayed and disillusioned". Lyrically, the song discusses the situation of being self-critical and famous at the same time.

Music video 
The Rory Kramer-directed music video for "Everybody Hates Me" was released on April 2, 2018. It features the duo racing through a tunnel in an open-top jeep before they are shown at a house party, with members Alex Pall and Taggart heavily drinking and sitting underwater in a pool, respectively. During the song's bridge and final drop, the duo pour gasoline on a car and set it on fire, making it explode.

Critical reception
Patrick Hosken of MTV News opined that the song sees "Drew Taggart ditches singing for a Drake-like recap of his innermost insecurities", writing that his voice "sounds closest to the prototypical emo-inspired whine on songs by the bands he grew up admiring, like Blink-182 and Panic! at the Disco". Jon Wiederhorn of CBS Radio deemed the song "yet another example of the group's catchy, beat-heavy blend of EDM and pop". Lauren O'Neill of Noisey ordered lyrics from the song "by Chainsmokers-Ness", calling it "a very Chainsmokers track". Derrick Rossignol of Uproxx regarded the song as "the type of EDM pop track we've come to expect from the Chainsmokers" and "one of the duo's more personal tracks". Andy Cush of Spin wrote: "'Everybody Hates Me' has one saving grace: a triumphant EDM drop to rival 'Roses,' delivering exactly the kind of sugar-coated synthy satisfaction they deliberately withheld on the previous whiners 'Sick Boy' and 'You Owe Me.'"

Track listing

Credits and personnel
Credits adapted from Tidal.
 Andrew Taggart – production, record engineering, composition, lyrics, voice.
 Alex Pall - production, record engineering.
 Emily Warren - lyrics.
 Shaun Frank – production, mix engineering, programming.
 Chris Gehringer – master engineering.

Charts

Weekly charts

Year-end charts

Certifications

Release history

References

2018 singles
2018 songs
2010s ballads
The Chainsmokers songs
Songs written by Andrew Taggart
Songs written by Emily Warren
Columbia Records singles